Carol Mahood Huddart is a Canadian legal scholar and former justice of the Supreme Court of British Columbia and British Columbia Court of Appeal. She initially practised in Ontario, later moving to Victoria, British Columbia, where she maintained a family law practice. She was first appointed to the bench in 1981, when she began serving on the County Court Bench in Vancouver. In 1987, she took up a position on the Supreme Court of British Columbia; in 1996, she was named to the Court of Appeal. Huddart took supernumerary status in 2003 and retired from the bench as of January 1, 2012.

Huddart has published several works on family law, including a book chapter on division of property and a guide to the practice of family law in British Columbia.

Publications

References 

20th-century Canadian judges
Canadian women judges
Family law scholars
Year of birth missing (living people)
Living people
20th-century Canadian women
20th-century women judges